Edward Steele may refer to:

Edward J. Steele (born 1948), Australian molecular immunologist
Edward Steele (footballer) (1873–?), English footballer
Edward Strieby Steele, American botanist
Ed Steele (Edward D. Steele, 1916–1974), American baseball outfielder
Edward H. Steele, namesake of Steele County, North Dakota